Nicola Granieri (3 July 1942 – 28 December 2006) was an Italian fencer. He competed at the 1964, 1968, 1972 and 1976 Summer Olympics in both épée and foil individual and team events with the best achievement of 7th place. He was the épée champion at the 1971 Fencing World Cup and won seventeen national titles over the course of his career. Granieri was also the president of the fencing club in his home town of Turin during 24 years.

References

1942 births
2006 deaths
Italian male fencers
Olympic fencers of Italy
Fencers at the 1964 Summer Olympics
Fencers at the 1968 Summer Olympics
Fencers at the 1972 Summer Olympics
Fencers at the 1976 Summer Olympics
Universiade medalists in fencing
Sportspeople from Turin
Universiade silver medalists for Italy
Universiade bronze medalists for Italy
Medalists at the 1967 Summer Universiade
Medalists at the 1970 Summer Universiade